Ina, Kasusuklaman Ba Kita? (International title: A Mother's Sacrifice / ) is a 2010 Philippine television drama series broadcast by GMA Network. Based on a 1985 Philippine film of the same title, the series is the eighteenth installment of Sine Novela. Directed by Gil Tejada Jr., it stars Jean Garcia and Jennica Garcia. It premiered on January 25, 2010 on the network's Dramarama sa Hapon line up replacing Tinik sa Dibdib. The series concluded on May 21, 2010 with a total of 82 episodes. It was replaced by Basahang Ginto in its timeslot.

Cast and characters

Lead cast
 Jean Garcia as Alvina Mendiola-Montenegro
 Jennica Garcia as Rizzi M. Bustamante

Supporting cast
 Ariel Rivera as Daniel Bustamante
 Iwa Moto as Rossan M. Ortega
 Dion Ignacio as Rav M. Asuncion
 Karla Estrada as Cora Evangelista
 Paulo Avelino as Cito Valera
 Luis Alandy as Brent Carlos
 Lloyd Samartino as Arnel Ortega
 LJ Reyes as Katrina Evangelista
 Regine Tolentino as Gina
 Richard Quan as Monching
 Dang Cruz as Bebang

Guest cast
 Renz Valerio as Rav
 Ella Cruz as Rossan
 Sandy Talag as Rizzi
 Sabrina Man as Katrina
 Gerard Pizarras as Benjie
 Toby Alejar as Ted Asuncion
 Caridad Sanchez as Susing Mendiola

Ratings
According to AGB Nielsen Philippines' Mega Manila household television ratings, the pilot episode of Ina, Kasusuklaman Ba Kita? earned a 17.9% rating. While the final episode scored a 14.6% rating.

References

External links
 

2010 Philippine television series debuts
2010 Philippine television series endings
Filipino-language television shows
GMA Network drama series
Live action television shows based on films
Television shows based on comics
Television shows set in the Philippines